Greya punctiferella is a moth of the  family Prodoxidae. It is found in the Pacific coastal ranges, the western slopes of the Cascades and in parts of the Sierra Nevada from south-eastern Alaska in the north to the Mendocino region of northern California in the south. The habitat consists of moist, coniferous or mixed conifer-Alnus forests.

The wingspan is 12.5–19 mm. The forewings are pale stramineous (straw-colored) with scattered brown spots. The hindwings are pale to median gray.

The larvae feed on Tiarella trifoliata, Tolmiea menziesii and Tellima grandiflora. The larvae are thought to be leaf miners.

References

Moths described in 1888
Prodoxidae